Nihad Guliyev (born 19 July 2001) is an Azerbaijani footballer who plays as a defender for Shamakhi FK in the Azerbaijan Premier League.

Club career
On 15 May 2022, Guliyev made his debut in the Azerbaijan Premier League for Qarabağ match against Sabail.

References

External links
 

2001 births
Living people
Association football defenders
Azerbaijani footballers
Azerbaijan youth international footballers
Azerbaijan under-21 international footballers
Azerbaijan Premier League players
Qarabağ FK players
Shamakhi FK players